The Tibetan skar was a weight unit representing a 100th part of one srang or the 10th part of one sho (i.e. about 0.37 g). The term was also used to refer to monetary units in the first half of the 20th century when copper coins were issued by Tibet (now People's Republic of China) which had the denominations 1/2, 1, 2 and half, 5 and 7 and half skar. One unit is referred to as skar gang in Tibetan.

Mimangxogngü skar

Since the 1950s, China has issued the homonymic mimangxogngü skar in Tibet, which is a synonym of renminbi fen. Since 1959, all traditional skar coins are substituted by 
Mimangxogngu skar.

Original meaning

The original meaning of this term is "star" which referred to the small stars which were found as subdivisions on the horizontal bar of Tibetan and Chinese scales. The moving of the string with which the weight was suspended to the beam from one star to the next represented the weight of one skar.

References

 Bertsch, Wolfgang: The Currency of Tibet. A Sourcebook for the Study of Tibetan Coins, Paper Money and other Forms of Currency. Library of Tibetan Works & Archives, Dharamsala, 2002.
 Gabrisch, Karl: Geld aus Tibet, Winterthur und Rikon 1990.

See also

 Historical money of Tibet
 Tibetan tangka
 Tibetan srang

Modern obsolete currencies
Economy of Tibet
History of Tibet